Pellicer is a surname. Notable people with the surname include:

Ana Pellicer (born 1946), Mexican sculptor, artisan, and jewelry maker
Carlos Pellicer (1897–1977), Mexican poet
Pina Pellicer (1934–1964), Mexican actress
Pilar Pellicer (1938–2020), Mexican actress

See also
Pellicier

Catalan-language surnames